The Combat Organization of Anarcho-Communists (BOAK) is a militant anarcho-communist organization in Eastern Europe, part of the Belarusian and Russian partisan movement. It aims for social revolution and a libertarian socialist society. Since the start of the 2022 Russian invasion of Ukraine, it has sabotaged railway infrastructure in Russia and Belarus, as well as attacking Russian military commissariats and telecommunications. According to The Insider, the group has become "the most active 'subversive' force" in Russia since the war began.

History 
The group's blog has been active since at least September 2020. In their interviews, members of the group said that the organization has existed for years before it decided to engage in partisan activity after the 2022 Russian invasion of Ukraine. The BOAK-affiliated 'Anarchist Fighter' website and Telegram channel have existed since 2018.

Opposition to the 2022 Russian invasion of Ukraine 
During the 2022 Russian invasion of Ukraine, BOAK claimed responsibility for actions designed to disrupt the logistics of the Russian Army in the Russian Federation and Belarus, organizing sabotage, arson of military registration and enlistment offices and rail wars in Belarus and Russia. A spokesperson for BOAK stated, "The war in Ukraine, unleashed by the Russian state, is a terrible tragedy, but the war created opportunities for the revolutionary minority, through partisan actions, to deepen the crisis of the system."

The name BOAK first time appeared in public on 18 April 2022 when the group claimed responsibility for sabotage of cell phone tower near village Belomestnoye in Belgorod Oblast, border region with Ukraine. The aim of an attack was declared to damage military communication network.

On 23 May 2022 BOAK claimed sabotage action against military railway tracks leading to the 12th Chief Directorate of the Russian Ministry of Defense near Sergiyev Posad in Moscow Oblast. According to the BOAK website, some rails were deconstructed.

On 28 June 2022 the cell "BOAK-Vladimir" published a press release claiming sabotage action on railway of military unit 55443 VD Barsovo (51st Arsenal of the Main rocket-artillery department of Russian Defense ministry) near Kirzhach in Vladimir Oblast. The rails were damaged. BOAK's press release stated, "Every stopped train helps to get rid of missiles and rockets, which could hit peaceful Ukrainian cities!"

On 9 October 2022, BOAK posted photos of sabotaged railway tracks in Barnaul, claiming that the sabotage had successfully derailed a freight train.

In an interview with British journalist Jake Hanrahan, members of BOAK claimed that they found their targets using intelligence from Wikimapia, an open source mapping project that details the location of Russian military infrastructure. One of the interviewees said that they were willing to die fighting the Russian state, rather than be subjected to torture in a Russian prison.

In January 2023, BOAK claimed responsibility for an explosion that damaged a section of the Trans-Siberian Railway in Krasnoyarsk.

See also
Anti-War Committee of Russia
Feminist Anti-War Resistance
Stop the Wagons
National Republican Army (Russia)
Network (Russia)

References

External links
BOAK in English
BOAK blog
Telegram channel "Anarchist Fighter"

2018 establishments in Russia
Anarchism in Belarus
Anarchist militant groups
Anarchist organizations in Russia
Anarcho-communism
Communist militant groups
Communist organizations in Russia
Insurgent groups in Europe
Insurrectionary anarchism
Opposition to Vladimir Putin
Organizations established in 2018
Resistance during the 2022 Russian invasion of Ukraine